E Shed Markets is a weekend market located on Victoria Quay in the Fremantle Harbour in Western Australia. It is housed in a historic timber building known as "E" Shed that was constructed in 1929 further up the quay and closer to the wharf. The building is one of a number of sheds that had varying names and locations in the twentieth century.

The original "E" Shed was demolished in 1929, with its replacement built at the same location. 

In 1995 this shed was moved from its location alongside the river at Victoria Quay to vacant land behind B and C sheds. The shed was rotated 180 degrees in the process. The design was carried out by Tarek Ibrahim for AND Design. The construction work was carried out by Fini Group for the cost of 6M including developing the building into a market.

See also
 Fremantle Passenger Terminal (comprising "F" and "G" Sheds)
 J Shed

References

External links

 

Heritage places in Fremantle
Retail markets in Western Australia
Fremantle Harbour
State Register of Heritage Places in the City of Fremantle